The 1999 All-Ireland Minor Football Championship was the 68th staging of the All-Ireland Minor Football Championship, the Gaelic Athletic Association's premier inter-county Gaelic football tournament for boys under the age of 18.

Tyrone entered the championship as defending champions, however, they were defeated in the Ulster Championship.

On 26 September 1999, Down won the championship following a 1–14 to 0–14 defeat of Mayo in the All-Ireland final. This was their third All-Ireland title overall and their first in 12 championship seasons.

Results

Connacht Minor Football Championship

Quarter-final

Semi-finals

Final

Leinster Minor Football Championship

Preliminary round

Quarter-finals

Semi-finals

Final

Munster Minor Football Championship

Rob robin

Semi-finals

Final

Ulster Minor Football Championship

Preliminary round

Quarter-finals

Semi-finals

Final

All-Ireland Minor Football Championship

Semi-finals

Final

References

1999
All-Ireland Minor Football Championship